The Stockton and District Tramways Company operated a steam tramway service between Stockton-on-Tees and Norton between 1893 and 1896.

History

The Stockton and District Tramways Company was a short lived tramway operator, surviving for only 3 years. In 1893 it took over the services operated by the Stockton and Darlington Steam Tramway Company which had run into financial difficulty.

Closure

It was unable to make the tramway pay and in 1896 it sold out to the Imperial Tramways Company. Steam services continued for a few months until the route was closed for modernisation, to later re-open as the Middlesbrough, Stockton and Thornaby Electric Tramways Company.

References

Tram transport in England
4 ft gauge railways in England
Transport in the Borough of Stockton-on-Tees